CKWT-FM is a radio station of Wawatay Radio Network in Sioux Lookout, Ontario, Canada. The station airs a  programming format for First Nations, and serves much of Northwestern Ontario through a network of rebroadcast transmitters.

Rebroadcasters

Notes
On March 4, 2016, the CRTC approved Wawatay's application for a broadcasting licence to operate a low-power Type B Native FM radio station in Sioux Lookout, Ontario. The station would operate at 89.9 MHz (channel 210A1) with an effective radiated power of 224 watts (non-directional antenna with an effective height above average terrain of 18.5 metres).

See also
 CIDE-FM
 CHWR-FM
 CJWT-FM

References

External links

Query the REC's Canadian station database for Wawatay Native Communications Society

Kwt
Kwt
Sioux Lookout
Year of establishment missing